The 2nd Summit of the Americas was held in Santiago, Chile, on April 18–19, 1998.

This  gathering of regional leaders was the first attempt in four years to negotiate conditions for the creation of a hemispheric free trade area.  No final agreements were made, but the nations set up a Trade Negotiations Committee (TNC) consisting of vice ministers from each country that would meet every few months.  Negotiations began with the Summits of the Americas in Miami in 1994.

Overview
The "Summit of the Americas" is the name for a continuing series of summits bringing together the leaders of North America and South America.  The function of these summits is to foster discussion of a variety of issues affecting the western hemisphere. These high-level summit meetings have been organized by a number of multilateral bodies under the aegis of the Organization of American States.  In the early 1990s, what were formerly ad hoc summits came to be institutionalized into a regular "Summits of the Americas" conference program.

 December 9–11, 1994  -- 1st Summit of the Americas at Miami in the United States.
 December 7–8, 1996  -- Summit of the Americas on Sustainable Development at Santa Cruz de la Sierra in Bolivia.

Protests and demonstrations
The summits which garnered most general public and media attention were the Quebec City and Mar del Plata events, both provoking very large anti-globalization and anti–Free Trade Area of the Americas protests.  Police responses to protesters and demonstrations developed into independent news stories.

Notes

References

External links
Summits of the Americas

Organization of American States
Politics of the Americas
Diplomatic conferences in Chile
20th-century diplomatic conferences
1998 in Chile
1998 in international relations
1998 in North America
1998 in South America
History of Santiago, Chile
1990s in Santiago, Chile
April 1998 events in South America
Presidency of Eduardo Frei Ruiz-Tagle